Richard Elfman (born March 6, 1949) is an American actor, musician, director, producer, screenwriter, journalist, author and magazine publisher.

Early life
Richard Elfman was born in the Watts district of inner-city Los Angeles. His mother, Blossom Elfman (A.K.A. "Clare Elfman"), was an Emmy-winning novelist. His younger brother is musician and film composer Danny Elfman, with whom Richard would later found the Mystic Knights of the Oingo Boingo, a performance art troupe that would later morph into Oingo Boingo, an eclectic band that was popular in the 1980s and 1990s.

When Richard was four, his family moved to the Crenshaw district, where Elfman excelled as a track champion at Dorsey High School, subsequently becoming an amateur middleweight boxer. Elfman dropped out of college and opened clothing stores adjacent UC Santa Barbara and UC Berkeley. At that time, Elfman performed and recorded as an Afro-Latin percussionist and wrote, performed and directed with the San Francisco musical theater group the Cockettes. He moved to Paris in the early 1970s to perform in theater as well as to record music in London. Presently, Elfman lives in the Hollywood Hills.

Career

Theatre
While in Paris, Elfman was a member of Jérôme Savarys musical theater company, Le Grand Magic Circus, which toured Europe extensively and performed the show Zartan for a year's run at the 800-seat Cité Internationale Universitaire de Paris. The company also performed at London's Roundhouse under the auspices of Savary's mentor, Peter Brook of the Royal Shakespeare Company. It was during the Magic Circus' summer tour that Richard's brother Danny received his first professional job as a violinist with the company, performing as an opening act alongside Richard on percussion.

Shortly after his stint with the Mystic Knights of the Oingo Boingo, Elfman acted in and directed a stage production of Igor Stravinskys L'Histoire du soldat, which won a Los Angeles Drama Critics Circle Award for Best Production.

In 2018 Richard wrote and directed an absurdist musical comedy in Los Angeles, Dead Man's Boner, co-starring his wife Anastasia Elfman. Richard played percussion in the show's band, Mambo Diabolico.

Richard and Anastasia Elfman currently host an underground musical/theatrical salon, The BBQ Bacchanals. Richard, a semi-professional barbecue chef, cooks as well as entertains.

Music
In 1972, Elfman returned to Los Angeles and formed his own troupe, the Mystic Knights of the Oingo Boingo, where he served as its creative director and percussionist. Elfman retrospectively described the Mystic Knights as a "commedia dell'arte ensemble", featuring upwards of fifteen musicians playing as many as thirty instruments, performing only recreated pieces of music from the 1920s through the 1940s as well as avant-garde originals composed by Elfman's brother Danny. The Mystic Knights performed steadily throughout the 1970s and gained a following in Los Angeles, which helped lead to a 1976 appearance on The Gong Show, where the group won the first place prize, and an uncredited cameo in the 1977 film I Never Promised You a Rose Garden. Elfman left the Mystic Knights in 1979 to pursue a career in filmmaking, after which Danny assumed creative control of the band, eventually shortening the name to "Oingo Boingo" and transforming it into an 8-piece rock band, which found success throughout the 1980s and 1990s.

Richard plays Afro-Latin percussion in the band Mambo Diabolico, originally created for a play of Richard's with collaborator Ego Plum. The band features five-octave singer Lena-Marie Cardinale and Anastasia Elfman's burlesque choreography. Mambo Diabolico was recently featured in Darren Lynn Bousman's immersive production Theatre Macabre. The band appeared on the soundtrack of Richard's film Aliens, Clowns & Geeks (2019).

Film
Elfman's first directing project was the cult musical film Forbidden Zone, which was shot over a period of three years and released in 1982. The film itself was a surreal black and white film version of the Mystic Knights' theatrical show starring its band members and friends; notably, Danny Elfman appears onscreen as Satan, singing a modified version of Cab Calloways "Minnie the Moocher", while Richard also appears, singing the 1920s song "The Yiddishe Charleston". In March 2010, Elfman premiered a colorized version of Forbidden Zone at New York's Museum of Modern Art in conjunction with a Tim Burton exhibition, while a stage musical adaptation, Forbidden Zone: Live in the 6th Dimension, ran at the Sacred Fools Theater Company in Los Angeles from May to June 2010.

Owing to its cult following, Forbidden Zone still screens in numerous cities and Elfman often performs in a live 20-minute pre-show composed of local artists, involving music, video clips and burlesque choreographed by Anastasia Elfman. Facilities allowing, Elfman, an accomplished grill-master, throws a barbecue after the show. More recently, theaters have also begun performing "shadow cast" screenings of Forbidden Zone similar to those made famous by The Rocky Horror Picture Show (1975), in which fans who are dressed in character perform in sync alongside the film. Elfman sometimes participates by playing characters in these live performances.

The Syfy channel has run a teaser musical number, "Princess Polly" from Forbidden Zone 2: The Forbidden Galaxy, on its show Monster Man, starring Cleve Hall. Elfman opens the Forbidden Zone shadow cast shows (after the march-in) with Erin Holt singing "Princess Polly" live in front of her screened "monster" image on stage.

Elfman also directed the 1994 horror film Shrunken Heads for Full Moon Entertainment—footage and scenery of which was later reused for sequences in the 1996 Full Moon feature Zarkorr! The Invader—and the 1998 horror comedy Modern Vampires, both of which were written by Forbidden Zone writer and former Mystic Knights member Matthew Bright. In a 2009 interview, Elfman revealed he had also done various pseudonymous film work under the names "Aristide Sumatra" and "Mahatma Kane Sumatra", including the 1994 Mimi Lesseos martial arts film Streets of Rage.

Elfman continues to work in film, television and streaming media, including the science fiction comedy Aliens, Clowns & Geeks, which debuted in 2019. The film features music by Richard's brother Danny.

Writing, publishing and mixed media
Elfman has been a published journalist for 30 years, focusing on food, wine, travel and entertainment. In 2007, he became a writer for Buzzine magazine, eventually becoming its film editor and then editor-in-chief. In 2010, Elfman and his son Louis purchased Buzzine, expanding it online and also creating a Buzzine Bollywood sister site. Between 2010 and 2015, Elfman produced 275 Buzzine red carpet, music and celebrity video interviews, as well as developed the web series Buzzine Celebrity House.

Personal life
Other members of Richard's family in the arts include his sister-in-law, actress Bridget Fonda; his son, actor-producer Bodhi Elfman; his daughter-in-law, actress Jenna Elfman; his niece, horror producer Mali Elfman; and his nephew, Emmy-winning broadcast journalist, Diego Santiago. 

Richard is married to Anastasia Elfman, a ballet dancer, actress, cellist and burlesque artist. They have a daughter, Audrey-Grace. His family is Jewish.

Filmography

As director

As actor

References

External links
ForbiddenZone.com, currently Elfman's official website

1949 births
American people of Polish-Jewish descent
American people of Russian-Jewish descent
American people of Ukrainian-Jewish descent
American Scientologists
Jewish American screenwriters
Richard
Living people
Male actors from Los Angeles
People from Crenshaw, Los Angeles
People from Watts, Los Angeles
Film directors from Los Angeles
Screenwriters from California
Susan Miller Dorsey High School alumni